René Raúl Drucker Colín (15 May 1937 – 17 September 2017) was a Mexican scientist, investigator and journalist in the fields of physiology and neuroscience. He was born in Mexico City, Mexico. From 1985 through 1990, he was the Director of Neuroscience at the National Autonomous University of Mexico. He was also the President of the Mexican Academy of Sciences from 2000 through 2002.

Drucker Colín died on 17 September 2017 in Mexico City at the age of 80.

Drucker Colín is commemorated in the scientific name of a species of lizard, Sceloporus druckercolini.

References

External links
.
Brief autobiography .

1937 births
2017 deaths
Mexican scientists
Mexican journalists
Male journalists
People from Mexico City
20th-century Mexican educators
Mexican educators